Nemipterus virgatus, the golden threadfin bream, is a species of threadfin bream native to the western Pacific, from southern Japan south to northwest Australia including the Arafura Sea. It is one of the most important species of commercial fisheries in the East China Sea and northern South China Sea.

See also
Chikuwa

References

virgatus
Fish described in 1782
Taxa named by Martinus Houttuyn